Fear in the Night is an American 1947 film noir crime film directed by Maxwell Shane, starring Paul Kelly and DeForest Kelley (in his film debut).  It is based on the Cornell Woolrich story "And So to Death" (retitled '"Nightmare" in 1943).  Woolrich is credited under pen name William Irish.  The film was remade by the same director in 1956 with the title Nightmare this time starring Edward G. Robinson playing the cop and Kevin McCarthy.

Plot
Bank teller Vince Grayson (DeForest Kelley) dreams that he stabs a man in an octagonal room of mirrors and locks the body in a closet.  When he wakes up, he discovers marks on his throat, a strange key and a button in his pocket, and blood on his cuff. Cliff Herlihy (Paul Kelly), his police officer brother-in-law, tries to convince him it was just a dream.

A few days later, while trying to find cover from the rain, the pair finds themselves taking shelter in the strange house from Vince's dream, which is owned by a Mr. and Mrs. Belknap. They discover that the police found two bodies at the house, one in the mirrored room and one run over in the driveway. Mrs. Belknap, who was run over by a car, gave the police a description matching Vince before she died.

At first Vince is hopeful that he is innocent because he does not know how to drive, but he recognizes the victims from his dream. Overcome with remorse, he attempts suicide, but is rescued by Cliff. The detective uncovers clues that point to an evil hypnotist (Robert Emmett Keane) manipulating Vince. They realize that the hypnotist is actually Mr. Belknap in disguise, and they try to trap him by pretending that Vince wants hush money.

Belknap puts Vince under hypnosis and tries to get him to drown himself. Cliff rescues him from the lake and Mr. Belknap is killed in a car accident as he is trying to evade the police. It is implied that Vince will be acquitted of all charges since he killed the man in the mirrored room in self-defense.

Cast
 Paul Kelly as Cliff Herlihy
 DeForest Kelley as Vince Grayson
 Ann Doran as Lil Herlihy
 Kay Scott as Betty Winters
 Charles C. Victor as Captain Warner
 Robert Emmett Keane as Lewis Belknap, aka Harry Byrd
 Jeff York as Deputy Torrence

Production
The film's original title was Nightmare. It was shot in ten days.

It was also known as Dead of Night.

Reception
 
When the film was released the film critic for The New York Times panned the film, writing, "Fear in the Night, a minor shocker which opened at the Rialto yesterday, is just about as ridiculous as any that comes in this line ... It is not only silly but rather dull. DeForest Kelley is dopey as the fall guy and Paul Kelly is brisk as his detective friend."

More recently, film critic Dennis Schwartz was more positive and liked the film, writing, "An excellent low-budget psychological thriller directed and written by Maxwell Shane that is based on the story "Nightmare" by Cornell Woolrich. Cinematographer Greenhalgh's shadowy black and white photography gives it a film noir look ... The taut pulp story, dreamy atmospheric settings and brooding mood throughout, all serve the film well. The crisp acting was just right. DeForest Kelley, in his debut performance, does a fine job as the innocent victim."

See also
 List of films in the public domain in the United States

References

External links

 
 
 
 
 
 Fear in the Night informational site and DVD review at DVD Beaver (includes images)
 Fear in the Night analysis by author Thomas C. Renzi at Film Noir of the Week
Review at Variety

Streaming audio
 Nightmare on Suspense: March 13, 1948. Radio drama of story on which the movie was based.

1947 films
1940s crime thriller films
American black-and-white films
Film noir
Films about hypnosis
Films based on short fiction
Films directed by Maxwell Shane
Paramount Pictures films
Films based on works by Cornell Woolrich
American crime thriller films
1940s English-language films
1940s American films